Trey DePriest (born June 9, 1993) is a former American football linebacker. He played college football at Alabama. He was signed as an undrafted free agent by the Baltimore Ravens in 2015.

High school career
A native of Springfield, Ohio, DePriest attended Springfield High School, where he played linebacker and handled the punting duties, averaging 37.7 yards. As a junior, he recorded 101 tackles in 2009 with seven sacks and 10 tackles for loss while recovering three fumbles, earning All-Area Defensive Player of the Year and All-State honors. In his senior season, he registered 117 tackles, 12 tackles for loss and nine sacks. Besides repeating as All-Area Defensive Player of the Year and All-State selection, he won the Ohio Division-I Defensive Player of the Year award and was named All-American by USA Today and SuperPrep.

Regarded as a four-star recruit by Rivals.com, DePriest was ranked as the No. 7 outside linebacker in his class. DePriest chose Alabama over Ohio State, Florida, LSU, Oklahoma and Notre Dame.

College career
He left high school a semester early in 2011 to start classes and participate in spring football practice at Alabama. He played in all thirteen games as a true freshman in 2011, with half of his 25 tackles coming on the kickoff coverage team. He finished the 2012 regular season second on the team in tackles to C.J. Mosley. As a junior in 2013, DePriest started all 13 games. He returned his senior season and again started all 14 games.

College career statistics

Professional career

Baltimore Ravens
On May 8, 2015, DePriest was signed by the Baltimore Ravens as an undrafted free agent. On May 27, 2015, he was cut by the Ravens.

References

External links

Alabama Crimson Tide bio

1993 births
Living people
Sportspeople from Springfield, Ohio
Players of American football from Ohio
American football linebackers
Alabama Crimson Tide football players
Baltimore Ravens players